The Tigers is a burlesque opera in a prologue and three acts by Havergal Brian. Written 1917–1919 and 1927–1929, it was lost, then recovered in 1977, and premiered in 1983 when it was recorded 3–8 January 1983 at BBC Maida Vale Studios. It was broadcast on BBC Radio 3 on 3 May 1983. The plot concerns a regiment nicknamed The Tigers.

Premiere and recording
Teresa Cahill (soprano); Alison Hargan (soprano); Marilyn Hill-Smith (soprano); Ameral Gunson (mezzo); Ann Marie Owens (contralto); Paul Crook (tenor); Harry Nicoll (tenor); John Winfield (tenor); Kenneth Woollam (tenor); Ian Caddy (baritone); Malcolm Donnelly (baritone); Henry Herford (baritone); Alan Opie (baritone); Alan Watt (baritone); Norman Welsby (baritone); Richard Angas (bass-baritone); Eric Shilling (bass–baritone); Dennis Wicks (bass) BBC Singers; BBC Symphony Orchestra conducted Lionel Friend

References

1929 operas
Compositions by Havergal Brian
Operas